The Neagra is a right tributary of the river Arieșul Mare in Romania. It discharges into the Arieșul Mare in Popeștii de Jos.

References

Rivers of Romania
Rivers of Alba County